Palaeomystella chalcopeda is a moth of the family Agonoxenidae. It is found in Brazil.

References

Agonoxeninae
Moths of South America